General elections were held in Italy on 21 March 1897, with a second round of voting on 28 March. The "Ministerial" left-wing bloc, led by Giovanni Giolitti remained the largest in Parliament, winning 327 of the 508 seats.

Background
The humiliating defeat of the Italian army at Adwa in March 1896 in Ethiopia during First Italo-Ethiopian War, brought about Francesco Crispi's resignation after riots broke out in several Italian towns.

The ensuing Antonio di Rudini cabinet lent itself to Cavallotti’s campaign, and at the end of 1897 the judicial authorities applied to the Chamber of Deputies for permission to prosecute Crispi for embezzlement. A parliamentary commission of inquiry discovered only that Crispi, on assuming office in 1893, had found the secret service coffers empty, and had borrowed money from a state bank to fund it, repaying it with the monthly installments granted in regular course by the treasury. The commission, considering this proceeding irregular, proposed, and the Chamber adopted, a vote of censure, but refused to authorize a prosecution.

The crisis consequent upon the disaster of Adowa enabled Rudinì to return to power as premier and minister of the interior in a cabinet formed by the veteran Conservative, General Ricotti. He signed the Treaty of Addis Ababa that formally ended the First Italo–Ethiopian War recognizing Ethiopia as an independent country. He endangered relations with Great Britain by the unauthorized publication of confidential diplomatic correspondence in a Green-book on Abyssinian affairs.

Di Rudinì recognized the excessive brutality of the repression of the Fasci Siciliani under his predecessor Crispi. Many Fasci members were pardoned and released from jail.

A new party participated to the election, the Italian Republican Party (PRI), led by Carlo Sforza. The PRI traces its origins from the time of Italian unification and, more specifically, to the democratic-republican wing represented by figures such as Giuseppe Mazzini, Carlo Cattaneo and Carlo Pisacane.

Parties and leaders

Results

References

General elections in Italy
Italy
General
Italy